Gandar is a surname. Notable people with the surname include:

 Laurence Gandar (1915–1998), South African journalist and newspaper editor
 Les Gandar (1919–1994), New Zealand politician
 Jacqueline Gandar (born 1994), French long-distance runner

See also
 Gander (surname)